Siw Hughes (born 16 January 1958) is a Welsh actress. She is best known for her role as Kath Jones in the long-running S4C soap opera, Pobol y Cwm, from 1993 to 2007, 2014 and 2017 onwards.

Early life

Hughes was born in Bangor, Gwynedd.  She has appeared in Welsh-language theatre productions, and in 2014 won a BAFTA Cymru award for Best Actress in a Television Drama, for her role in the S4C series Gwaith/Cartref.

Career

Welsh comedian Iwan John has a running joke in which he spoofs the Kath Jones character, using such overemphasised catch-phrases as "Blincin fflip!" a "Iyffach gols!".

References

External links
 

1958 births
Living people
People from Bangor, Gwynedd
Welsh soap opera actresses